Migration of the Serbs may refer to:

 Great Migration of the Serbs (1690), a migration of Serbs during the Habsburg-Ottoman War (1683-1699)
 Great Migration of the Serbs (1737), a migration of Serbs during the Habsburg-Ottoman War (1737-1739)
 Demographic history of Serbia, during other historical periods 
 Serbian diaspora, modern migration
 Theories on the early migrations of the Serbs, during the medieval period
 Migration of the Serbs (painting), by Paja Jovanović (1896)

See also
 History of the Serbs
 Migration (disambiguation)
 Great Migration (disambiguation)